Robert Maguire Kolf (February 1, 1898 – May 31, 1990) was an American football coach. He was an alumnus of Oshkosh Normal School (later renamed the University of Wisconsin–Oshkosh). He returned to the school as an instructor and coach in 1923. He was an athletic coach at the school for 45 years, leading the school to 29 conference championships in 10 sports. He was the football coach in 1929, from 1931 to 1942, and 1946 to 1962. He also served as the athletic director and coached basketball, tennis, track and field, and golf, among other sports. He was part of the inaugural class inducted into the UW Oshkosh Athletic Hall of Fame in 1974. The Kolf Sports Center at Oshkosh opened in 1971 and was named in his honor.

Head coaching record

Football

References

External links
 

1898 births
1990 deaths
American football quarterbacks
Guards (basketball)
Ripon Red Hawks football coaches
Ripon Red Hawks men's basketball coaches
Wisconsin–Oshkosh Titans athletic directors
Wisconsin–Oshkosh Titans baseball players
Wisconsin–Oshkosh Titans football coaches
Wisconsin–Oshkosh Titans football players
Wisconsin–Oshkosh Titans men's basketball coaches
Wisconsin–Oshkosh Titans men's basketball players
College golf coaches in the United States
College tennis coaches in the United States
College track and field coaches in the United States
High school basketball coaches in Wisconsin
Sportspeople from Oshkosh, Wisconsin
Coaches of American football from Wisconsin
Players of American football from Wisconsin
Baseball players from Wisconsin
Basketball coaches from Wisconsin
Basketball players from Wisconsin